The 1988–89 SM-liiga season was the 14th season of the SM-liiga, the top level of ice hockey in Finland. 12 teams participated in the league, and TPS Turku won the championship.

Standings

Playoffs

Quarterfinals
 JyP HT - HIFK 2:0 (4:3, 3:2)
 Tappara - KalPa 2:0 (6:0, 7:6)

Semifinals
 TPS - Tappara 3:2 (1:3, 4:5, 3:1, 5:2, 7:3)
 Ilves - JyP HT 1:3 (4:5 P, 2:4, 7:4, 1:3)

3rd place
 Ilves - Tappara 10:3

Final
 TPS - JyP HT 4:1 (5:0, 2:4, 3:1, 7:1, 4:1)

Relegation
 JoKP Joensuu - Ässät Pori 3:2 (5:4 OT, 4:5, 5:1, 3:5, 5:3)
 Kärpät Oulu - Jokerit Helsinki 2:3 (7:3, 3:7, 8:4, 2:3, 2:5)

External links
 SM-liiga official website

1988–89 in Finnish ice hockey
Fin
Liiga seasons